Carl Andrews (1947 – 1990) was a British character actor. Andrews' most notable role was as garage mechanic Joe MacDonald, British soap opera's first, and one of the longest serving, recurring black characters in the original version of the popular motel soap Crossroads. Andrews remained in the role from 1978 until 1986.

Personal life 
He died from complications of AIDS at the age of 43.

References

External links
 

1947 births
1990 deaths
British male soap opera actors
20th-century British male actors